Cullinan may refer to:

Cullinan (surname), a surname
Rolls-Royce Cullinan, an ultra-luxury SUV produced by Rolls-Royce Motor Cars
Cullinan, Gauteng, a small town in South Africa
Cullinan Diamond, the largest rough gem-quality diamond ever found
Cullinan Finance, an SIV (structured investment vehicle) run by HSBC
The Cullinan, a residential estate in Hong Kong